Darius Magdišauskas (born 14 July 1969) is a Lithuanian former footballer who played as a centre-back.

Career
Magdišauskas started his career with Belarusian side Lida. Before the 1990 season, he signed for Kareda in Lithuania. After that, Magdišauskas signed for Estonian club Flora. In 1997, he signed for TP-Seinäjoki in the Finnish top flight, where he made 17 league appearances and scored 0 goals.

Before the 1998 season, Magdišauskas signed for Latvian team Liepājas Metalurgs. Before the 2000 season, he signed for B36 in the Faroe Islands. In 2000, he signed for Vagar. After that, he signed for Swedish outfit IK Arvika. In 2006, he was appointed manager of Šiauliai. In 2010, he was appointed manager of IFK Strömstad.

References

External links
  
 

Living people
1969 births
Lithuanian footballers
Association football central defenders
FC Lida players
FC Šiauliai players
ROMAR Mažeikiai players
FC Flora players
JK Tervis Pärnu players
TP-Seinäjoki players
FK Liepājas Metalurgs players
B36 Tórshavn players
07 Vestur players
IK Arvika players
Vágs Bóltfelag players
A Lyga players
Belarusian Premier League players
Meistriliiga players
Veikkausliiga players
Latvian Higher League players
Faroe Islands Premier League players
Lithuania international footballers
Lithuanian expatriate footballers
Lithuanian expatriate sportspeople in Belarus
Lithuanian expatriate sportspeople in Estonia
Lithuanian expatriate sportspeople in Finland
Lithuanian expatriate sportspeople in Latvia
Lithuanian expatriate sportspeople in the Faroe Islands
Lithuanian expatriate sportspeople in Sweden
Expatriate footballers in Belarus
Expatriate footballers in Estonia
Expatriate footballers in Finland
Expatriate footballers in Latvia
Expatriate footballers in the Faroe Islands
Expatriate footballers in Sweden